The Tokyo Reporter is a Japanese English-language news website whose reporting is based on Japanese tabloid journalism.

The Tokyo Reporter
Founded in 2008 by Brett Bull, a U.S. engineer working in Tokyo, the website translates or adapts reports by Japanese tabloid media about such topics as crime, sex and entertainment in Japan. The Washington Post described it as a "hybrid of the National Enquirer, the New York Post and Penthouse". The Post wrote that, because Japanese tabloids are less reliant on authorities for their content than Japanese mainstream media, and less concerned about the international reputation of the nation, Tokyo Reporter projects a less sanitized image of Japan to the outside world than the English language versions of mainstream media.

The last newly released article on TokyoReporter was published on August 16, 2021, and the site has not been updated since. On January 26, 2022, the closure of TokyoReporter was formally announced.

Brett Bull 
Brett Bull, a civil engineer for a Japanese construction company in Ōtsuka, an author and a freelance journalist, writes for Variety, Metropolis Japan Magazine, The New York Times, Japan Today The Japan Times, Loafer's Magazine, and others. From 17 November 1999 to 29 December 2007, he wrote as Captain Japan for his Sake-Drenched Postcards.

Works

References

External links

2008 establishments in Japan
Japanese news websites
Mass media in Tokyo